Thomas Ernest Bennett "Tibby" Clarke, OBE (7 June 1907 – 11 February 1989) was a film screenwriter who wrote several of the Ealing Studios comedies. 

Clarke's scripts always feature careful logical development from a slightly absurd premise to a farcical conclusion. In 1952, he was awarded a Best Original Screenplay Oscar for his script for The Lavender Hill Mob, making him one of just a handful of Britons to receive this award. He continued to work as a scriptwriter after Ealing ceased production, his later contributions including Sons and Lovers and the Disney film The Horse Without a Head.

Clarke was also a novelist and writer of non-fiction, but presented at least one fictional work as fact. His book Murder at Buckingham Palace (1981) purports to tell the story of a hushed-up murder in the Royal residence in 1935. Despite its including 'documentary' photographs, there is no external evidence that the book is anything but pure fiction. For The Blue Lamp (1950) he drew on his experience as a war reserve constable with the Metropolitan Police during the Second World War.

He was awarded the OBE in 1952. He was the subject of This Is Your Life in 1960 when he was surprised by Eamonn Andrews at the BBC Television Theatre.

Early life
Clarke was born in Watford on 7 June 1907. His father, Ernest Clarke, had been raised in Hull, moving to South Africa in the late 19th century. He was enlisted to carry dispatches for the Jameson Raid though, avoiding imprisonment, managed to obtain a job working for a gold mining company. Ernest then married Madeline Gardiner, with whom he raised three children. The eldest child was Dudley Clarke, who would later become a pioneer of military deception operations during the Second World War. A girl, Dollie, followed. 

The gold mining company Ernest had been working for then offered him an opportunity to move to their London office, enabling him to return to England with his young family. They sailed from South Africa, the first ship to leave the country following the end of the Boer War.
Upon arriving in England, Ernest purchased a house in Watford, where Madeline gave birth to their third and final child, Thomas Ernest Bennett Clarke.

Bibliography

Screenplays

Johnny Frenchman (1945)
Hue and Cry (1947)
Against the Wind (1948)
Passport to Pimlico (1949)
The Blue Lamp (1950)
The Magnet (1950)
The Lavender Hill Mob (1951)
The Titfield Thunderbolt (1953)
The Rainbow Jacket (1954)
Barnacle Bill (US: All at Sea, 1957)
Gideon's Day (US: Gideon of Scotland Yard, 1958)
Sons and Lovers (1960)
The Horse Without a Head

Non-fiction

Go South - Go West
What's Yours?
Intimate Relations
This is Where I Came In

Novels

Jeremy's England
Cartwright Was a Cad
Two and Two Make Five
Mr Spirket Reforms
The World Was Mine
The Wide Open Door
The Trail of the Serpent
The Wrong Turning
The Man Who Seduced a Bank
Murder at Buckingham Palace
Intimate Relations

References

External links
 

1907 births
1989 deaths
Best Original Screenplay Academy Award winners
People educated at Charterhouse School
People from Watford
20th-century British screenwriters
Metropolitan Police officers